The Commissioner for Cohesion and Reforms is a portfolio within the European Commission. The current Commissioner is Elisa Ferreira.

The portfolio is responsible for managing the regional policy of the European Union, such as the European Regional Development Fund, which takes up a third of the EU's budget.

Current commissioner
Commissioner Elisa Ferreira was approved by the European Parliament in 2019.

List of commissioners

See also
 Directorate-General for Regional Policy
 European Regional Development Fund
 Structural Funds and Cohesion Funds
 Instrument for Structural Policies for Pre-Accession
 European Social Fund

External links
 Commissioner's website 
 Regional Policy, Inforegio 
 DG regional policy 
 EU regional policy portal 

Regional Policy